Lexington House is an historic riverfront hotel located in Catskill Park on the south side of the Schoharie Creek in the Town of Lexington in Greene County, New York.  Lexington House was built about 1883 as a middle class resort and is a large, three story frame building arranged in a modified "L" shaped configuration. It features Italianate and Eastlake design elements. Also on the property is the Morse Inn (c. 1881), a former ice house (c. 1900), wagon house (c. 1883) and shed (c. 1900).  The River Theater (c. 1887) stood on the property until about 2011 when it was severely damaged.  
Its construction coinciding with the development of the Catskill and Tannersville Railway, the Lexington House is a rare surviving example of mid-scale, railroad-era resort architecture.  The Lexington House, featuring thirty rooms, advertised facilities for 50-60 guests. Architecturally, the Lexington House embodies a variety of distinctive characteristics commonly associated with this type of resort architecture. On the exterior the most salient features associated with the type are the broad verandah and second-story balconies. Expansive porches and open-air balconies were an essential feature of the resort hotel, providing guests with vistas of the surrounding wilderness and pleasant public spaces for social gatherings. Verandahs also served as sanitary and therapeutic retreats from which to enjoy the healthful and moral atmosphere of nature, reflecting the popularity of resorts not only for pleasure and recreational activity but also for escapes from the crowded, disease-ridden and immoral conditions of the suddenly industrialized cities of the northeast.

The interior of the Lexington House illustrates the typical plan of the mid-scale resort hotel. The ground floor, still virtually intact in spatial configuration and restrained architectural detailing, provided large public spaces for a variety of reception and entertainment uses. No late-nineteenth century resort hotel was complete without a ballroom. According to information currently available, dances were initially held in the sitting parlor and/or dining area of the main house.  Dances were held in the River Theater following its completion in approximately 1887. Guest rooms, still intact, flank long corridors along the second and third stories, amply ventilated with movable transoms and numerous windows. The Lexington House was particularly progressive for its time, featuring an elaborate system of gas lighting throughout the building and fire-stop framing between the wall cavities and dwelling units. Shared sanitary facilities were located at convenient locations on each floor (modern plumbing was installed in the 1930s). The rear wings and dependencies housed the support facilities for the hotel (laundry, kitchen, storage and ice house) while the various outbuildings provided facilities for resort-related activities. The large wagon house provided livery services for the guests, while the River Theater provided space for local performers and travelling opera, melodrama and vaudeville companies as well as dancing. (A theater was, like the ballroom, an essential component of the Catskill resort experience. Evers, et alia, p. 23).  [T]he Lexington House was, according to a number of late-nineteenth century accounts, considered to be one of the finest, most popular resorts of the period, offering a broad range of entertainment and activity. 

The Lexington House was listed on the National Register of Historic Places in 1986.  The PBS documentary film “The Loss of Nameless Things” recounts the life of playwright Oakley “Tad” Hall III, founder of the Lexington Conservatory Theater, a summer stock company, and the events that transpired around Lexington House in the 1970s.

It was part of a property called Camp Lexington Center for Performing Arts, owned by Evelyn and Hy Weisberg, from approximately 1950 to 1970. For part of that time, the older girl campers lived in the building, which was then called the Sorority House. 

The Lexington House was owned by Art Awareness, Inc. in the 1970s, which used the property for arts education and production.  It was purchased by the Ensemble Studio Theater in the 1990s for use as an artists' retreat.  It was acquired by Lexington Arts & Science, LLC in 2019.

References

Hotel buildings on the National Register of Historic Places in New York (state)
Queen Anne architecture in New York (state)
Italianate architecture in New York (state)
Houses completed in 1883
Hotels established in 1883
Buildings and structures in Greene County, New York
National Register of Historic Places in Greene County, New York